Grand Principality of Rus' or Grand Duchy of Rus' may refer to:

 Grand Principality of Kievan Rus', an East Slavic medieval state, centered in Kiev
 Grand Principality of Vladimirian Rus', an East Slavic medieval state, centered in Vladimir
 Grand Principality of Muscovite Rus', an East Slavic medieval state, centered in Moscow
 Grand Principality of Rus' (1658), a proposed state in Eastern Europe

See also
 Principality of Rus' (disambiguation)
 Rus' (disambiguation)
 Russia (disambiguation)
 Ruthenia (disambiguation)